Lead Us Back: Songs of Worship is the twelfth studio album from Third Day. Essential Records released the project on March 3, 2015. The album was released in two versions: a single-CD version with a white cover, and a deluxe edition, two-CD set with a black cover.

Critical reception

Grace S. Aspinwall, designating the album four stars out of five from CCM Magazine, declares, "Lead Us Back: Songs of Worship brings them full-circle, with a masterful collection of new worship favorites." Signaling in a seven out of ten review by Cross Rhythms, Sam Hailes recognizes, "'Lead Us Back' is a solid effort, and within the worship genre it stands out for the right reasons." Alex Caldwell, indicating in a four and a half star review out of five from Jesus Freak Hideout, realizes, "Lead Us Back proves to be a great worship piece and a mid-career highpoint in a veteran band's catalog." Specifying in a four star review for Jesus Freak Hideout, Bert Gangl responds, "such an absolutely unique and beautiful work." Jeremy Armstrong, mentioning in a four star review by Worship Leader, reports, "Even his country releases bleed with his guttural, gravelly voice. But the straightforward guitar rock of this worship release is also surrounded with some piano drive, beautiful orchestrations, and ambient pop that help lift the songs to anthemic intensity." Awarding the album four and a half stars from 365 Days of Inspiring Media, Jonathan Andre writes, "such a powerful and prolific album". Daniel Edgeman, rating the album a 3.9 out of five at Christian Music Review, says, "Overall I am satisfied with Lead Us Back, I was just hoping for a little more – a more pepped up sound... The production and message are strong on this record, so I would give it a solid 3.9." Writing a review for Christian Review Magazine, Christian St. John rating the album four stars states, "Lead Us Back is a toned down album, so don't expect the same musical gusto you get on a Third Day album." DeWayne Hamby, reviewing the album for Charisma, writes, "the new album showcases original worship songs ready for personal and corporate praise accompanied by choirs and guest vocalists."

Accolades
This album was No. 9, on the Worship Leaders Top 20 Albums of 2015 list.

Track listing

 Personnel Third Day Mac Powell – lead vocals 
 Mark Lee – guitars
 Tai Anderson – bass 
 David Carr – drums Additional musicians Scotty Wilbanks – keyboards (1–12), acoustic piano (1–12, 15–22), organ (1–12, 15–22), programming (15–22), backing vocals (15–22), arrangements (15–22)
 JT Daly – keyboards (1–12), programming (1–12), percussion (1–12), backing vocals (1–12)
 Jonny MacIntosh – keyboards (1–12, acoustic piano (1–12), programming (1–12, guitars (1–12), mandolin (1–12), backing vocals (1–12)
 Brian Bunn – guitars (15–21)
 Jason Hoard – guitars (22)
 Christian Howes – strings (5)
 Alexander Tseitlin – strings (9)
 Eamon McLoughlin – strings (12)
 All Sons & Daughters – backing vocals (2, 12)
 Harvest Parker – guest vocals (3)
 David Crowder – backing vocals (6)
 Natalie Grant – guest vocals (6)
 Michael W. Smith – guest vocals (6)
 Michael Tait – guest vocals (6)
 Sarah Macintosh – backing vocals (9), gang vocals (1–12)
 Michael Gungor – backing vocals (10, 11)
 Derek Henbest – backing vocals (10)
 Karen Henbest – backing vocals (10)
 Karyn Williams – guest vocals (17)
 Daniel Bashta – gang vocals (1–12)
 Ricky Thade Cole – gang vocals (1–12)
 Melissa Drummond – gang vocals (1–12)
 Harvest Parker – gang vocals (1–12)
 James Shealy – gang vocals (1–12)
 Julia West – gang vocals (1–12)Production'

 Terry Hemmings – executive producer 
 JT Daly – producer (1–13)
 Jonny MacIntosh – producer (1–13), mixing (7, 12, 13)
 Third Day – producers (14–22)
 Scotty Wilbanks – additional production (15–22), additional tracking (15–22)
 Kyle Horvath – production assistant (15–22)
 Blaine Barcus – A&R 
 Michelle Box – A&R production
 TJ Elias – engineer (1–12)
 Darrell Thorp – engineer (1–12)
 Brent Maloney – gang vocal engineer (1–12)
 Andy Selby – digital editing (1–12)
 Keith Everett Smith – digital editing (13–22)
 Chris Lord-Alge – mixing (1–6, 8–11, 14)
 Sean Moffitt – mixing (15–22)
 Warren David – mix assistant (15–22)
 Tom Coyne – mastering (1–12)
 Bob Boyd – mastering (13–22)
 Beth Lee – art direction, design 
 Tim Parker – art direction, design 
 Eric Brown – photography 
 Traci Scrignoli – wardrobe

Charts

Weekly charts

Year-end charts

References

External links
 AllMusic

2015 albums
Third Day albums
Essential Records (Christian) albums
Contemporary worship music albums